Xenohyla eugenioi is a species of tree frog in the Hylidae family native to northeastern Brazil in ecotones between the Atlantic Forest and caatingas. It has been found in the Brazilian states of Bahia and Sergipe, approximately 1,000 km away from the other species in its genus, Xenohyla truncata. Like its relative, this frog spends the day hiding in bromeliads, emerging at night to hunt and forage.

X. eugenioi keeps its white stripes through adulthood. Additionally, the species prefers to inhabit agrestes, and breeds in temporary pools formed by rainwater. Males grow from 30.9 to 31.5 mm (1.22 to 1.24 in) SVL while females reach 39.5 to 45.5 mm (1.56 to 1.8 in) SVL. It is currently unknown if this frog is also frugivorous like its relative.

Xenohyla eugenioi is named after the Brazilian herpetologist Eugênio Izecksohn. Izecksohn described the type species Hyla truncata in 1959 and later established the genus Xenohyla where he transferred it to in 1998.

References

Xenohyla
Endemic fauna of Brazil
Amphibians described in 1998
Taxa named by Ulisses Caramaschi
Taxonomy articles created by Polbot